Bruce C. Lennon (born 1 December 1970) is a former Australian rules footballer who played with the Sturt Football Club in the SANFL and Richmond in the Australian Football League (AFL).

Lennon was the 33rd selection of the 1988 National Draft, taken by Richmond from Sturt.

He had to wait until round six of the 1992 AFL season to make his debut, but then missed just one game for the rest of the year. The South Australian recruit made a further 10 appearances in 1993.

Back at Sturt in 1994, Lennon won the first of two best and fairest awards, the other coming in 2000. He retired in 2002 after 209 games for Sturt.

References

External links
 
 

1970 births
Australian rules footballers from South Australia
Richmond Football Club players
Sturt Football Club players
Living people